The Extraordinary and Plenipotentiary Ambassador of Peru to the Kingdom of Saudi Arabia is the official representative of the Republic of Peru to the Kingdom of Saudi Arabia.

Since the post's creation, the ambassador in Riyadh is also accredited to Bahrain and Oman.

Both countries established relations in April 1986, but diplomatic representation to the Arabian Peninsula had existed since their accreditation from the Embassy in Lebanon at least 20 years prior. Peru opened its embassy in Riyadh in 2012.

List of representatives

See also
List of ambassadors of Peru to Kuwait
List of ambassadors of Peru to Qatar
List of Consuls-General of Peru in Dubai

References

Saudi Arabia
Peru